The Whitefish Point Light is a lighthouse located in Chippewa County in the U.S. state of Michigan.  Located on the southeastern shores of Lake Superior, it sits at the edge of Whitefish Point leading to Whitefish Bay.  Constructed in 1849, it is the oldest operating lighthouse in the Upper Peninsula.  All vessels entering or exiting Lake Superior pass near Whitefish Point.  The area is infamously known as the "Graveyard of the Great Lakes" due to the high number of shipwrecks in the area, most famously the SS Edmund Fitzgerald.

The lighthouse is part of the Great Lakes Shipwreck Museum complex, which contains numerous relics from shipwrecks of the Whitefish Point Underwater Preserve, including the bell of the SS Edmund Fitzgerald.  The lighthouse itself was listed on the National Register of Historic Places in 1973 and again as a Michigan State Historic Site in 1974.

History

Construction on the first light began in 1847, and the lighthouse was said to resemble that at Old Presque Isle Light. First lit in 1849, it was one of the first lighthouses on the shores of Lake Superior. It is the oldest active light on the lake, standing at the point of land that marks the course change for vessels coming from the southern coast of Lake Superior, known as the "Graveyard of the Great Lakes", to the Soo Locks. All vessels entering or leaving Lake Superior must past Whitefish Point. Whitefish Point Light is arguably the most important light on Lake Superior. The Whitefish Point area has more shipwrecks than any other area in Lake Superior.

The original structure was outfitted with Lewis lamps, which were thereafter upgraded to a fourth order Fresnel lens. The current structure, while modern looking, is a Civil War relic.  Built in 1861, the iron skeletal steel framework was designed to relieve stress caused by high winds. A similar design is used at Manitou Island Light in Lake Superior. It was equipped with a third order Fresnel lens.

In 1968, the light was replaced with a DCB-224 aero beacon manufactured by the Carlisle & Finch Company. Putting aside questions of nostalgia, aesthetics, or appreciation for the engineering of a bygone era (as exemplified by the Fresnel lens), this iteration of lighthouse illumination was itself incredibly effective, and an endangered remnant of another bygone era.

The station was automated in 1971.

The aerobeacon lens is stored in a building at the Great Lakes Shipwreck Museum complex for possible future public display.

The lighthouse is home to the Great Lakes Shipwreck Museum, which has many artifacts from numerous shipwrecks in the Whitefish Point Underwater Preserve, most notably, the bell from the SS Edmund Fitzgerald, which was recovered from the wreck in 1995. The Great Lakes Shipwreck Museum is open during the tourist season from 10 am to 6 pm, every day through October 31. The organization that operates the museum got 80.079% of its funding from the public in the year 2010.

The light is considered iconic, and has been the subject of memorabilia. An official Michigan Historical Marker was erected in 1974. It is Registered Site L0272. The marker notes:

This light, the oldest on Lake Superior, began operating in 1849, though the present tower was constructed later. An early stopping place for Indians, Voyageurs, Coureur des bois and Jesuit missionaries, the point marks the course change for ore boats and other ships navigating this treacherous coastline to and from St. Mary's Canal. Since 1971 the light, fog signal, and radio beacon have been automated and controlled from Sault Ste. Marie.

The keepers were:
1848–1851:    James B. Van Rensselaer
1851–1853:    Amos Stiles
1853–1856:    William C. Crampton
1856–1859:    Belloni McGulpin
1859–1861:    Charles Garland
1861–1864:    Joseph Kemp
1864–1868:    Thomas Stafford
1868–1874:    Edward Ashman
1874–1882:    Charles J. Linke
1882–1883:    Edward Chambers
1883–1903:    Charles Kimball
1903–1931:    Robert Carlson

Whitefish Point is on the Lake Superior coastline known as the “Graveyard of the Great Lakes”.  The numerous shipwrecks of Whitefish Bay include: 
Comet
John B. Cowle 
Drake
Samuel Mather
Miztec
Myron
Niagara
John M. Osborn
Sagamore

Vienna

These wreck sites are protected for future generations of sports divers by the Whitefish Point Underwater Preserve.

The site is a venue for remembrance of the S.S. Edmund Fitzgerald, and extends back to the 1816 loss of "the very first ship known to sail on Superior, the sixty-foot trading vessel Invincible," which upended in gale force winds and towering waves near there. "[E]very loss was tragic."

There are critics that claim that the stewardship of the Great Lakes Shipwreck Historical Society over this lighthouse caused it to be "overdeveloped." Michigan Audubon Society filed a lawsuit that accused the Great Lakes Shipwreck Historical Society of over-developing Whitefish Point and the United States Fish & Wildlife Service of not protecting the site. The lawsuit was settled in 2002 when the parties agreed to govern the site with a management plan. The former 44-acre Coast Guard site at Whitefish Point consists of 2.7 acres transferred to the Michigan Audubon Society and the Whitefish Point Bird Observatory, 8.3 acres transferred to the Great Lakes Shipwreck Museum, and 33 acres transferred to the US Fish and Wildlife Service administered by Seney National Wildlife Refuge. The 20-acre Helstrom Addition was added to the Whitefish Point Unit of the Seney National Wildlife Refuge in 2012 so that the US Fish and Wildlife Service now holds a total of 55 acres at Whitefish Point.

Other uses
The Whitefish Point Unit of the Seney National Wildlife Refuge provides important migratory bird migration habitat for raptors, waterbirds, and songbirds.  Whitefish Point is a designated Important Bird Area .  The Whitefish Point Bird Observatory is a research and education facility operated in affiliation with Michigan Audubon, a State Chapter of the National Audubon Society.  Whitefish Point is the best place in North America to observe the saw-whet owl.  Most of Whitefish Point is a wildlife sanctuary, renowned for the variety of birds that pass through. The Michigan Audubon Society maintains a small information room informing birders particular species to observe as they hike along the trails network.  A wooden walkway has been constructed to allow the visitor a chance to venture into the sanctuary area and observe wildlife. Whitefish Point is a target for migrating birds, including eagles, Northern goshawks, geese, falcons, hawks and owls.

The sandy beach along the point is an exciting place to look for banded agates, especially after a storm or to take a walk along the sandy shoreline and enjoy the magic of Lake Superior.

In 2012, for the fourth year in a row after a 23-year absence, piping plovers nested at Whitefish Point, and successfully fledged offspring.

It is well marked.

See also
 Lighthouses in the United States
 Great Lakes Storm of 1913 and Shipwrecks of the 1913 Great Lakes storm

Specialized further reading
 Hermanson, Don, True Lighthouse Hauntings, Revisited including Whitefish Point Light.
Lynn, Bruce. "A Light is on in the Graveyard, Whitefish Point." (Aug 1997), pp. 1–3 Lighthouse Digest.

Notes

External links
 
 
 Whitefish Point Unit of Seney National Wildlife Refuge
 Aerial photos, Whitefish Point Light, marinas.com.
 National Park Service Maritime Heritage, Inventory of Historic Lights, Whitefish Point Light.
 Shipwreck Museum at Whitefish Point Light.
 Terry Pepper, Seeing the Light – Whitefish Point Lighthouse.
 Whitefish Point Lighthouse - United States Lighthouses

Lighthouses completed in 1849
Lighthouses completed in 1861
Lighthouses on the National Register of Historic Places in Michigan
Michigan State Historic Sites
Marine parks of Michigan
Important Bird Areas of Michigan
Lighthouse museums in Michigan
Museums in Chippewa County, Michigan
Protected areas of Chippewa County, Michigan
1849 establishments in Michigan
National Register of Historic Places in Chippewa County, Michigan
Lighthouses in Chippewa County, Michigan